Colegio Suizo de Madrid (CSM) is a Swiss international school in Alcobendas, Community of Madrid, Spain.

It serves students in levels pre-Kindergarten until Bachillerato/Gymnasium (senior high school).

It was first established in 1968.

References

External links
  Colegio Suizo de Madrid
  Colegio Suizo de Madrid

Madrid
International schools in the Community of Madrid
1968 establishments in Spain
Educational institutions established in 1968
Schools in Alcobendas